The 1998 Trans America Athletic Conference baseball tournament was held at Osceola County Stadium in Kissimmee, Florida. This was the twentieth tournament championship held by the Trans America Athletic Conference.  won their second tournament championship and earned the conference's automatic bid to the 1998 NCAA Division I baseball tournament.

Format and seeding 
The top six finishers by overall winning percentage qualified for the tournament, with the top seed playing the lowest seed in the first round. College of Charleston was ineligible as it completed its transition from NAIA.

Bracket

All-Tournament Team 
The following players were named to the All-Tournament Team.

Most Valuable Player 
Edwin Franco was named Tournament Most Valuable Player. Franco was a pitcher for FIU.

References 

Tournament
ASUN Conference Baseball Tournament
Trans America Athletic Conference baseball tournament